Vai na Fé (English title: Never Give Up) is a Brazilian telenovela created by Rosane Svartman. It premiered on TV Globo on 16 January 2023. The telenovela follows Sol (Sheron Menezzes), a church choir singer who decides to become a back-up singer for Lui Lorenzo (José Loreto), in order to fix her family's financial difficulties. Carolina Dieckmann, Emilio Dantas, and Samuel de Assis also star.

Plot 
In her youth, Sol (Sheron Menezzes) gave up her dream of becoming a funk singer to become an Evangelical and marry Carlão (Che Moais). However, 20 years later, Sol receives an invitation to be a back-up singer for the declining singer Lui Lorenzo (José Loreto), after being discovered singing while selling boxed lunches in downtown Rio de Janeiro. With two daughters to raise and an unemployed husband, Sol accepts, but the decision turns her life upside down: she gains more and more fame and is harassed in church for her "worldly" behavior, as well as facing Lui's infatuation and reuniting with Ben (Samuel de Assis), her love from her youth who never forgot her. This reunion calls into question Ben's marriage to Lumiar (Carolina Dieckmann), a tough and controlling lawyer, and Lui's half-sister.

Cast

Main 

 Sheron Menezzes as Solange "Sol" Carvalho Gonzaga
 Jê Soares as Young Sol
 Carolina Dieckmann as Lumiar Lorenzo Garcia
 Hanna Romanazzi as Young Lumiar
 Emilio Dantas as Theo Bragança
 Matheus Polis as Young Theo
 Samuel de Assis as Benjamin "Ben" Garcia
 Isacque Lopes as Young Ben
 José Loreto as Lui Lorenzo Campos
 Pedro Burgarelli as Child Lui
 Regiane Alves as Clara Bragança
 Bella Campos as Jenifer Daiane Carvalho Gonzaga
 Elisa Lucinda as Marlene Gonzaga
 Rhavine Chrispim as Young Marlene
 Carla Cristina Cardoso as Bruna Ferreira
 Dhara Lopes as Young Bruna
 Luis Lobianco as Vitinho
 Anderson Oli as Young Vitinho
 Marcos Veras as Simas
 Marcus Maria as Young Simas
 Letícia Salles as Érica Ventania
 Che Moais as Carlos "Carlão" Eduardo Carvalho
 Mateus Honori as Young Carlão
 Cláudia Ohana as Dora Lorenzo
 Zé Carlos Machado as Fábio Lorenzo
 Jonathan Haagensen as Orfeu Maranhão
 Nicollas Paixão as Young Orfeu
 Mel Maia as Guilhermina "Guiga" de Alcântara Azevedo
 Henrique Barreira as Frederico "Fred"
 Jean Paulo Campos as Yuri dos Santos
 Gabriel Contente as Otávio "Tatá" Villar
 Caio Manhante as Rafael "Rafa" Bragança
 Flora Camolese as Bia Vieira
 Clara Serrão as Bela
 MC Cabelinho as Hugo Maranhão
 Orlando Caldeira as Antony Verão
 Priscila Steinman as Helena
 Azzy as Ivy Furacão
 Tati Villela as Naira
 Lucas Oradovschi as Jairo
 Neyde Braga as Neide Coutinho
 Waldo Piano as Joel Coutinho
 Alan Oliveira as DJ Cidão
 Adriano Canindé as Pastor Miguel
 Clara Moneke as Kate Cristina Ferreira
 Manu Estevão as Maria Eduarda "Duda" Carvalho da Silva
 Nego Ney as Gil
 Felipe Rodrigues as Bryan Lucas Coutinho
 Nathália Costa as Meire
 Renata Sorrah as Wilma Campos

Recurring 
 Theo Parizzi as Vicente
 Laiza Santos as Alice
 Bruno Padilha as Emílio de Alcântara Azevedo
 Zé Wendell as Charles Pierre
 Cris Werson as Sabrina Vieira
 Giuliano Laffayete as Fabrício
 Duda Moreira as Niltão
 Miguel Emidio as Erick
 Pedro Camargo as Kaduzinho

Guest stars 
 Deborah Secco as Alexia Máximo
 Diego Montez as Willian Carneiro
 Sofia Starling as Gisela
 Jade Cardoso as Letícia
 Laiza Santos as Alice
 Zé Wendell as Charles Pierre
 Renata Miryanova as Sheila
 Ubiraci Miranda as Jefferson

Production 
In October 2021, Rosane Svartman's synopsis was approved by TV Globo, with the working title being Tente Outra Vez. The telenovela was scheduled to premiere in November 2022. However, so that it wouldn't be disrupted by the coverage of the 2022 FIFA World Cup, the premiere was postponed to January 2023. Filming of the telenovela began in October 2022, in Nova Friburgo, Lumiar and São Pedro da Serra. On 13 December 2022, the first teaser for the telenovela was released.

Ratings

References

External links 
 

2023 Brazilian television series debuts
2023 telenovelas
2020s Brazilian television series
TV Globo telenovelas
Brazilian telenovelas
Portuguese-language telenovelas
Musical telenovelas
Television series about fictional musicians